Sarah Street (born 1958) is professor of Film and Foundation Chair of Drama at University of Bristol.

Education 
Street received a Bachelor of Arts from University of Warwick and a Doctor of Philosophy from Oxford University.

Research 
Street researches 20th century British film, with a special focus on color film, costume design, and set design. In 1997, she wrote British National Cinema, the first substantial overview of this subject; it is now in its second edition.

In 2012, she received a grant from the Leverhulme Trust to research color cinema in the 1920s. From 2016 to 2019, Street was the principal investigator of a grant from the Arts and Humanities Research Council to research Eastmancolor, a type of color film produced by Kodak that was introduced to Britain in the 1950s. She has received other AHRC research grants for British color film.

She serves as an editor of the journal Screen and on the editorial board of Journal of British Cinema and Television. She is also a jury member for Best British Film of the Iris Prize, a queer film festival.

Honors and awards 
Her book Colour Films in Britain received the 2014 First Prize for Best Monograph from The British Association of Film, Television and Screen Studies. In 2019, Street received The Colour Group (Great Britain) Turner Medal, which honors artists or art historians. In 2020, she and Joshua Yumibe received the 2020 Katherine Singer Kovács Book Award from the Society for Cinema and Media Studies for their book Chromatic Modernity (2019).

Publications 

 Dickinson, Margaret and Sarah Street. Cinema and State: Film Industry and the British Government, 1927–84. United Kingdom: Bloomsbury Academic, 1985.
 Street, Sarah. British National Cinema. United Kingdom: Routledge, 1997. Republished in 2008. 
 Street, Sarah. British Cinema in Documents. United Kingdom: Routledge, 2000. Republished in 2016. 
 Street, Sarah. Costume and Cinema: Dress Codes in Popular Film. United Kingdom: Wallflower, 2001. 
 Street, Sarah. Transatlantic Crossings: British Feature Films in the USA. United Kingdom: Bloomsbury Academic, 2002. 
 Street, Sarah. Black Narcissus: Turner Classic Movies British Film Guide. United Kingdom: I. B. Tauris, 2005. 
 Harris, Sue, Sarah Street and Tim Bergfelder. Film Architecture and the Transnational Imagination: Set Design in 1930s European Cinema (Film Culture in Transition). Amsterdam: Amsterdam University Press, 2007. 
 Street, Sarah and Jackie Stacey, editors. Queer Screen: A Screen Reader. United Kingdom: Routledge, 2005. 
 Street, Sarah. Colour Films in Britain: The Negotiation of Innovation 1900–1955. United Kingdom: British Film Institute, 2012. 
 2nd edition: Street, Sarah. Colour Films in Britain: The Negotiation of Innovation 1900–1955. United Kingdom: Bloomsbury Publishing, 2019. 

 Street, Sarah and Jill Forbes. European Cinema: An Introduction. United Kingdom: Macmillan Education, Limited, 2017. 
 Giovanna Fossati et al. The Colour Fantastic: Chromatic Worlds of Silent Cinema. Netherlands: Amsterdam University Press, 2018. 
 Street, Sarah. Deborah Kerr. United Kingdom: Bloomsbury Publishing, 2019. 
 Yumibe, Joshua and Sarah Street. Chromatic Modernity: Color, Cinema, and Media of the 1920s. United States: Columbia University Press, 2019.

References 

1958 births
Living people
British film historians
Women academics